= Budhla Sant =

Town in Punjab, Pakistan

Budhla Sant is a town located to the east of Multan, in southern Punjab, Pakistan. At 30.1538° N, 71.7118° E .

Budhla Sant is located in suburb of Multan, Khanewal, and Jahanian at a distance: 19, 30, and 10 respectively. Postcode of Budhla Sant is 59021. The town has many schools, colleges and branches of commercial banks.

== History ==
Budhla Sant has inherited a diverse character from its historical footprints: a sign of which is the Talab (pond) in the center of the city, built by Raja Dahir. Before the partition of India it had a religious importance for Hindus who celebrate a festival on 15 March every year at the Talab.
